Field & Stream: Trophy Bass 4, also known as simply Trophy Bass 4, is a fishing video game developed and published by Sierra On-Line for Microsoft Windows in 2000. It is the fourth game in the Trophy Bass series.

Reception

The game received above-average reviews according to the review aggregation website GameRankings.

References

External links
 

2000 video games
Fishing video games
Sierra Entertainment games
Video game sequels
Windows games
Windows-only games
Video games developed in the United States